Shinee World IV (promoted as SHINee CONCERT "SHINee WORLD IV") is the fourth concert tour by South Korean boy group, Shinee. The tour kicked off in Seoul from May 15–17, 2015.

Background
On March 25, 2015, SM Entertainment announced that Shinee would embark on their fourth concert tour in May, starting with two concerts at the Olympic Gymnastics Arena in Seoul. Tickets went on sale on April 2. An additional performance was added to the schedule after both Seoul shows sold out. Ahead of the concert, streaming service Genie held a promotional event where fans voted for their favourite Shinee song. Shinee previewed songs from their upcoming album Odd at the show, including lead single "View". The tour continued to Taipei on August 16, where they performed new song "Married to the Music", and later to Bangkok. It was Shinee's first time holding a concert in Thailand, and the event was attended by around 200 reporters from 100 major media outlets.

Set list

Schedule

References

External links
SM Entertainment – Official website
Shinee – Official South Korean website

Shinee concert tours
2015 concert tours